Sounds of the Satellites is the second studio album by British band Laika. It was released through Too Pure in 1997.

Critical reception

Rob Brunner of Entertainment Weekly said, "Sounds of the Satellites entrancing blend of heavy bass, gurgling electronics, and moody melodies — sung with low-key intensity by former Moonshaker Margaret Fiedler — is rich enough to hold your attention even when it doesn't move your feet." Jason Ankeny of AllMusic wrote that the album "is even better than its predecessor, a simultaneous expansion of the band's sonic palette and a brilliant refinement of their past innovations."

Track listing

Personnel
Credits adapted from liner notes.

Laika
 Margaret Fiedler – vocals, sampler, guitar, bass guitar, Moog synthesizer, trumpet, drums, engineering, mixing
 Guy Fixsen – vocals, sampler, guitar, bass guitar, Moog synthesizer, trumpet, drums, engineering, mixing
 Rob Ellis – vocals, prepared piano, drums, percussion
 Lou Ciccotelli – percussion
 Louise Elliot – flute

Additional musicians
 Alonso Mendoza – vibraphone

Production
 Jai Williams – assistance
 Liam Molloy – assistance
 Tony Cousins – mastering

Artwork and design
 Laika – layout
 Rachel Fixsen – original snowdome artwork
 John Summerhayes – photography

References

External links
 

1997 albums
Laika (band) albums
Too Pure albums